is a 1986 platform game developed and published by Taito for arcades. It was distributed in the United States by Romstar, and in Europe by Electrocoin. Players control Bub and Bob, two dragons that set out to save their girlfriends from a world known as the Cave of Monsters. In each level, Bub and Bob must defeat each enemy present by trapping them in bubbles and popping, who turn into bonus items when they hit the ground. There are 100 levels total, each becoming progressively more difficult.

Bubble Bobble was designed by Fukio "MTJ" Mitsuji. When he joined Taito in 1986, he felt that Taito's game output was of mediocre quality. In response, he decided to make a game that was fun to play and could rejuvenate the company's presence in the industry. Mitsuji hoped his game would appeal to women, specifically couples that visited arcades. As such, he decided to make Bubble Bobble focus largely on its two player co-operative mode. He made bubbles the core mechanic as he thought they would be a fun element that girls would enjoy.

Bubble Bobble became one of Taito's biggest arcade successes, and is credited with inspiring the creation of many similar screen-clear platform games that followed. It was acclaimed by critics for its character design, memorable soundtrack, gameplay, and multiplayer, and is often listed among the greatest games of all time. Bubble Bobble was followed by a long list of sequels and successors for multiple platforms; one of these, Puzzle Bobble, has become successful in its own right and spawned its own line of sequels.

Plot
"Baron Von Blubba" has kidnapped the brothers Bubby and Bobby's girlfriends and turned the brothers into Bubble Dragons, Bub and Bob. Bub and Bob have to finish 100 levels in the Cave of Monsters in order to rescue them.

Gameplay

In the game, each player controls one of the two dragons. Players can move along platforms, fall to lower ones, and jump to higher ones and over gaps. Each level is limited to a single screen, with no left/right scrolling; however, if a screen has gaps in its bottom edge, players can fall through these and reappear at the top. Each level has a certain number of enemies that must be defeated in order to advance. The players must blow bubbles to trap the enemies, then burst these bubbles by colliding with them. Each enemy defeated in this manner turns into a food item that can be picked up for extra points. Defeating multiple enemies at once awards higher scores and causes more valuable food items to appear. All bubbles will float for a certain length of time before bursting on their own; players can jump on these and ride them to otherwise inaccessible areas. Magic items appear from time to time and grant special abilities and advantages when picked up. Special bubbles occasionally appear that can be burst to attack enemies with fire, water, or lightning. Furthermore, if a player collects letter bubbles to spell the word EXTEND, a bonus life is earned and both players immediately advance to the next level.

A player loses one life upon touching any free enemies or their projectiles (rocks, fireballs, lasers, bottles).  Enemies turn "angry"—turning pink in color and moving faster—if they escape from a bubble after being left too long or the players spend a certain amount of time on the current level. They return to normal if either player loses a life. After a further time limit expires, an additional invincible enemy appears for each player, actively chasing them using only vertical and horizontal movements. These disappear once the level is cleared, or when a player loses a life. When there is only one enemy left, it immediately becomes angry and remains in this state until defeated.

In the 100th and final level, players face a boss. This is one of the first games to feature multiple endings. Completing Level 100 in single-player mode reveals a message stating that the game has not truly ended and a hint to the player: "Come here with your friend." If two players complete the game, they see a "happy end", in which the brothers are transformed to their human selves and reunited with their girlfriends. This ending also includes a code that, when deciphered, allows the game to be played in the faster and more difficult "super" mode. If this mode is completed with two players, a second "happy end" is displayed in which Super Drunk (the defeated boss) is revealed to be the brothers' parents under the control of some outside influence. The brothers return to normal and are reunited with their parents and girlfriends.

Also, if the player(s) reach levels 20, 30, or 40 without losing a life, a doorway will appear in each of those levels, transporting the player to a secret room and displaying a coded message that, once decoded, gives the player a major hint / spoiler on how to beat the game.

Development and release
Bubble Bobble was designed by Fukio Mitsuji, a Japanese game designer at Taito. A fan of arcade games by Namco, specifically Xevious, Mitsuji felt that Taito's output by comparison were lackluster and of poor quality, hoping that he could help push the company to produce higher-quality arcade titles. His first game was the four-screen racer Super Dead Heat in 1985, followed by the shoot'em up Halley's Comet the same year. After work on these two games was completed, Mitsuji set out to make his next project a platform game, featuring cute characters and a more comical setting compared to his previous works.

Mitsuji wanted the game to be exhilarating and to appeal towards a female audience. Thinking about what kind of things women like to draw or sketch, Mitsuji created an extensive list of over 100 ideas, and after a process of elimination selected bubbles as the core game mechanic. He liked the idea of the screen being filled with bubbles, and thought that popping them all at once would provide a thrilling sensation to the player. His initial idea was to have the player control a robot with a spike on its head to pop bubbles—Mitsuji disliked it for not being "cool", instead preferring dinosaurs with ridges along their back. He liked to write down ideas on paper as soon as he thought of them, often flooding his office with stacks of paper filled with potential ideas for game mechanics.

Mitsuji constantly tried to think of new ways to make the game better than it was before, saying to have lost sleep while trying to figure out how he could improve it. He often worked on holidays and late at night to come up with new ideas for the game and to perfect it. Several of the enemies were taken from Chack'n Pop (1983), an older Taito game that is often considered a precursor to Bubble Bobble. Mitsuji intended the game to be played by couples, leading to the creation of the multiple endings, which differ based on player performance.

Bubble Bobble was first published in Japan on June 16, 1986, followed by a wide release in Japan in September 1986 and internationally in October 1986. Alongside Arkanoid, Taito licensed the game to Romstar for distribution in the United States, and to Electrocoin Automatics for Europe.

Ports
Bubble Bobble was ported to many home video game consoles and computers, including the ZX Spectrum, Commodore 64, Apple II, Amiga, Famicom Disk System, Nintendo Entertainment System, MSX2, and Sega Master System—the last of these has two hundred levels as opposed to the arcade version's 100 levels, and was released in Japan as Final Bubble Bobble. A version for the X68000 was developed by Dempa and released in 1994, which includes a gamemode paying homage to Mitsuji's later arcade game Syvalion, titled Sybubblun. Conversions for the Game Boy and Game Boy Color were respectively released in 1991 and 1996, the GBC port being named Classic Bubble Bobble. A version of Bubble Bobble was also produced for the unreleased Taito WOWOW console. In 1996, Taito announced that the source code for Bubble Bobble had been lost, leading to all subsequent home conversions to be reverse-engineered from an original arcade board.

Reception

In Japan, Game Machine listed Bubble Bobble on their November 1, 1986, issue as the second-most-successful table arcade cabinet of the month, after Taito's Arkanoid. It went on to be the fifth-highest-grossing table arcade game of 1987 in Japan. In the United Kingdom, Bubble Bobble was the top-grossing arcade game for three months in 1987, from April to June. The home conversions were also successful in the United Kingdom, where the game appeared on the sales charts for several years. The ZX Spectrum budget re-release topped the UK charts in July 1991.

The arcade game received positive reviews from Computer and Video Games and Crash. Mean Machines gave the Game Boy port of the game a score of 91%, noting that, while some changes had been made, the game played identical to the original arcade port and "provides much addiction and challenge". The four reviewers of Electronic Gaming Monthly stated that the Game Gear version is a faithful conversion of the original which works well in portable form. They particularly praised the simplicity of the gameplay concept and the graphics, and the two-player link option.

Bubble Bobble has been listed by numerous publications among the greatest video games of all time. Your Sinclair magazine ranked the ZX Spectrum version at #58 in their "Top 100 Games of All Time" in 1993 based on reader vote. In 1996, GamesMaster rated the game 19th on its "Top 100 Games of All Time." Yahoo! ranked it at #71 in their "100 Greatest Computer Games Of All Time" in 2005 for its charming premise and cute character designs. Stuff magazine listed it as part of their "100 Greatest Games" in 2008, while GamesTM magazine listed it in their "Top 100 Games" in 2010. Stuff.tv ranked it at #47 in their Top 100 Games in 2009, saying "today’s kids might laugh, but this was gold in 1986". GamesRadar+ ranked it at #95 in their "100 Best Games Of All Time" list in 2011, praising its multiplayer and secrets. GamesRadar+ also labeled it the 24th greatest Nintendo Entertainment System of all time in 2012 for its advancements over other games of its genre and its usage of multiple endings. IGN named it the 23rd best NES game. Hardcore Gaming 101 listed it in their book The 200 Best Video Games of All Time in 2015. Game Informer placed it in their "Top 300 Games of All Time" in 2018 for its long-lasting appeal and multiplayer.

Legacy

Re-releases
The game has had at least 30 official ports to a large array of computers and consoles throughout the decades.

In October 2005, a version was released for the Xbox, PlayStation 2, and Microsoft Windows as part of the Taito Legends compilation.

At the end of 2006, a new port for mobile phones in Europe and Japan was released.

On December 24, 2007, the NES version of Bubble Bobble was released  in North America on Nintendo's Virtual Console service for the Wii. The Famicom Disk System version of Bubble Bobble was also released for the Nintendo eShop on October 16, 2013, for the Nintendo 3DS and on January 29, 2014, for the Wii U.

On November 11, 2016, the game was included in the NES Classic Edition.

Sequels
Rainbow Islands: The Story of Bubble Bobble 2 (1987)
Rainbow Islands Extra Version (1988)
Parasol Stars (1991 originally released for TurboGrafx-16, converted for NES (Europe only), Amiga, Atari ST, and Game Boy (Europe only))
Bubble Bobble Part 2 (1993 Nintendo Entertainment System, Game Boy)
Bubble Bobble II (worldwide) / Bubble Symphony (Europe, Japan, U.S.) (1994 Arcade, Sega Saturn (Japan only))
Bubble Memories: The Story of Bubble Bobble III (1995 Arcade)
 Packy's Treasure Slot (1997 Medal Game)
 Bubble'n Roulette (1998 Medal Game)
 Bubblen No KuruKuru Jump! (1999 Medal Game)
Rainbow Islands: Putty's Party (2000 Bandai WonderSwan)
Bubble Bobble EX (2001 Pachislot)
Bubble Bobble Old & New* (remake, 2002 Game Boy Advance)
Bubble Bobble Revolution (2005 Nintendo DS, called Bubble Bobble DS in Japan) 
Rainbow Islands Revolution (2005 Nintendo DS)
Bubble Bobble Evolution (2006 PlayStation Portable)
Rainbow Islands Evolution (2007 PlayStation Portable)
Bubble Bobble Plus! (2009, WiiWare on the Wii) also known as  Bubble Bobble Neo! (2009 Xbox Live Arcade on Xbox 360)
Rainbow Islands: Towering Adventure (2009 WiiWare, Xbox Live Arcade)
Bubble Bobble Double (2010 iOS)
Bubble Bobble for Kakao (iOS, Android) - June 15, 2015 (this game was published for KakaoTalk messaging app and fully Taito licensed)
Bubble Bobble 4 Friends (2019, Nintendo Switch in Europe; February 20, 2020, in Japan; March 31, 2020, in North America; and November 19, 2020, PlayStation 4 in Japan)
Puzzle Bobble VR (2021 Oculus Quest)
Many of the characters and musical themes of Bubble Bobble were used by Taito in a tile-matching video game Puzzle Bobble (also known as Bust-a-Move) and its sequels.

Notes

References

External links

Bubble Bobble for the Atari ST at Atari Mania

 
1986 video games
Amiga games
Amstrad CPC games
Apple II games
Arcade video games
Atari ST games
Commodore 64 games
Cooperative video games
DOS games
Famicom Disk System games
Game Boy Color games
Game Boy games
Game Gear games
Mobile games
MSX2 games
Nintendo Entertainment System games
Nintendo Switch games
FM Towns games
Platform games
PlayStation (console) games
PlayStation 4 games
Romstar games
Master System games
X68000 games
Video games scored by David Whittaker
Video games scored by Tim Follin
Virtual Console games for Wii U
ZX Spectrum games
Square Enix franchises
Video games with alternate endings
Taito arcade games
Hamster Corporation games
NovaLogic games
Video games developed in Japan